M274 may refer to:

 Mercedes-Benz M270/M274 engine, an automobile engine
 M274 ½-ton 4×4 utility platform truck, U.S. military truck platform
 SMPTE 274M, a high definition video standard